Yambuk  is a town in Victoria, Australia.

The name Yambuk is an Aboriginal word thought to mean "red kangaroo", "full moon" or "big water".

Shell middens in the limestone cliffs to the east of the town indicate that Aboriginal people had lived in the area for at least 2300 years.

European settlement took place in the area when Lieutenant Andrew Baxter and his wife Annie Baxter squatted the Yambuck pastoral run in 1843. 

Annie Baxter's diary notes 13 occasions where European settlers formed armed and mounted hunting parties to attack and harass Gunditjmara people. These events were part of the significant conflict between Aboriginal peoples and Europeans that occurred around Yambuk at the time. 

Some of the most violent clashes of the western district taking place near the Shaw river and the Eumeralla River. This conflict known as the Eumeralla wars continued from the 1840s to around 1860.

The township was established in the 1850s, the Post Office opening 1 March 1859.

It is located where the Princes Highway crosses the Shaw River. It is the site of Pacific Hydro's Yambuk Wind Farm and the adjacent Codrington Wind Farm.

Yambuk is locally known for the Yambuk Slide, a 33-metre long slide near the lake.  Lake Yambuk and the Yambuk Important Bird Area lie between the town and the coast.

Traditional ownership
The formally recognised traditional owners for the area in which Yambuk sits are the Eastern Maar (western portion) and the Gunditjmara peoples (eastern portion) who are represented by the Eastern Maar Aboriginal Corporation (EMAC) and the Gunditj Mirring Traditional Owners Aboriginal Corporation (GMTOAC).

References 

Place Names Search: Yambuk

External links

Towns in Victoria (Australia)
Coastal towns in Victoria (Australia)
1850s establishments in Australia